Kevin Arseneau is a Canadian politician, who was elected to the Legislative Assembly of New Brunswick in the 2018 election. He represents the electoral district of Kent North as a member of the Green Party. He is the first Acadian to be elected as a third-party MLA in New Brunswick as well as the first Francophone in North America to be elected under the Green Party banner.

Early life and education
Arseneau was born on August 25, 1985, in Robertville, New Brunswick. In 2003, he graduated from École Secondaire Népisiguit in Bathurst. He holds an education degree from the Université de Moncton with a major in geography and a minor in history. He also has a diploma in adventure tourism from the Cégep de la Gaspésie et des Îles.

Career
Arseneau is a farmer and member of the Ferme Terre Partagée workers’ cooperative, a farm that produces organic fruit and vegetables and raises animals humanely, and which received an award in 2018 from RDÉE Canada (Réseau de développement économique et d’employabilité) in the young entrepreneur category. He is also a storyteller and musician who has given hundreds of performances in New Brunswick, elsewhere in Canada, and in Europe. He has also taught at École W.-F.-Boisvert, in Rogersville, and contributed to implementing a philosophy program for children in kindergarten to Grade 4 classes, in cooperation with the Université de Moncton.

He previously chaired the Rogersville Local Service District Advisory Committee and was President of the Société de l’Acadie du Nouveau-Brunswick (SANB). He has served on the boards of the Kent Regional Service Commission, the Société nationale de l’Acadie (SNA), the Fédération des communautés francophones et acadienne du Canada (FCFA), and the Rogersville Cooperative. He was President of the Fédération des étudiants et étudiantes du Centre universitaire de Moncton (FÉÉCUM) and served on the Équiterre family farmers network follow-up committee.

Political career
He was first elected on September 24, 2018, to represent the riding of Kent North and reelected in the 2020 provincial election.

Arseneau is critic for the second opposition group in the following areas: developing and strengthening communities; food sovereignty; fiscal, economic, and social justice. He is a member of the Legislative Administration Committee, the Standing Committee on Estimates and Fiscal Policy, and the Standing Committee on Economic Policy.

Electoral record

References

Living people
Green Party of New Brunswick MLAs
21st-century Canadian politicians
1985 births